Old Barge, Young Love (German:Alter Kahn und junge Liebe) may refer to:

 Old Barge, Young Love (1957 film), an East German film
 Old Barge, Young Love (1973 film), a West German film director by Werner Jacobs